Silent Number is an Australian TV series about a police doctor played by Grigor Taylor. It was created by Ron McLean. It aired from 1974 to 1976.

Cast
 Grigor Taylor
 Elizabeth Alexander
 Deryck Barnes
 Rosalind Speirs
 Tony Wager
 Don Reid
 Christine McCourt

References

External links
Silent Number at National Film and Sound Archive
Silent Number at IMDb
Silent Number at Classic Australian TV
Silent Number at AustLit

1970s Australian crime television series
1974 Australian television series debuts
1976 Australian television series endings